Norsjö IF is a Swedish football club located in Norsjö in Västerbotten County.

Background
Since their foundation in 1919 Norsjö IF has participated mainly in the middle and lower divisions of the Swedish football league system.  In 2010 the club played in Division 3 Norra Norrland which is the fifth tier of Swedish football but finished in last position and will play in Division 4 Västerbotten Norra for the 2011 season. They play their home matches at the Rännaren in Norsjö.

Norsjö IF are affiliated to the Västerbottens Fotbollförbund.

Season to season

Attendances

In recent seasons Norsjö IF have had the following average attendances:

Footnotes

External links
 Norsjö IF – Official website

Football clubs in Västerbotten County
Association football clubs established in 1919
1919 establishments in Sweden